Philodytes umbrinus is a species of beetle in the family Dytiscidae, the only species in the genus Philodytes.

References

Dytiscidae